Mirror, Mirror is a 1990 American supernatural horror film directed by Marina Sargenti, based on a screenplay by Annette Cascone and Gina Cascone. It stars Karen Black, Rainbow Harvest, Yvonne De Carlo and William Sanderson. The film follows a teenage outcast who finds herself drawn to an antique mirror left in the house she and her mother have moved into. A soundtrack for Mirror, Mirror was released in 1990 through Orphan Records.

Plot
In 1950s Iowa, Mary Weatherford sacrifices her sister Elizabeth in front of a large mirror, stabbing her to death on a bed. Decades later, Megan Gordon, a shy teenage goth, moves to Los Angeles, California with her recently widowed mother Susan. In her new bedroom, Megan finds the large mirror in the corner left behind by the previous owners. Emelin, the auctioneer in charge of the house clearance, finds a cache of journals that describe the mirror's apparent possession by a demonic force able to grant wishes.

At her new school, Megan is taunted mercilessly by her peers, apart from the friendly Nikki as well as handsome, athletic Ron. Charleen, a bully running for class president against Nikki, quickly targets Megan. Meanwhile, as Megan becomes drawn to the mirror in her room, she's plagued by bizarre incidents at home; her mother's dog mysteriously dies, she's visited by a gruesome apparition of her dead father, and the mirror begins inexplicably dripping blood. Megan becomes convinced that the mirror is responsible for a series of misfortunes involving those around her, including Charleen experiencing a massive nosebleed in the cafeteria, and her teacher, Mr. Anderson, having a severe asthma attack during class.

Realizing the mirror's powers, Megan begins harnessing them herself, using them to manipulate Jeff, Charleen's love interest, into developing a crush on her instead. When Jeff stops a sexual encounter, the demon in the mirror brutally murders him before making his body disappear. The next day, Emelin attempts to retrieve the mirror from the house while Megan and Susan are gone, but her hands are mysteriously impaled, leading her to flee. When Nikki loses the student council race to Charleen, Megan harnesses the mirror's powers to scald Charleen to death in the girls' locker room showers, before killing Charleen's friend Kim in a bathroom.

Nikki becomes discomforted by Megan's change in personality, and is disturbed when Megan suggests she "helped" her usurp the class presidency. Nikki meets with Mrs. Perfili, the local real estate agent, and Emelin to inquire about the history of Megan's house and the mirror. Emelin reveals the content of the journals to Nikki, and explains that Mary Weatherford sacrificed her sister in front of the mirror decades ago hoping to appease it. After Nikki leaves, Emelin is impaled to death with a shard of glass at her antiques store.

That night, Ron is attacked by a doppelgänger of Nikki in his house and brutally murdered. After finding Ron's body, Nikki receives a phone call from Megan asking her to come to her house. Meanwhile, Susan has her hand mangled in the garbage disposal in the kitchen and bleeds to death, leading Megan to turn against the mirror. Nikki arrives armed with a dagger and attempts to shatter the mirror, but it is resistant. She and Megan attempt to flee as a torrent of wind fills the house, but are unable to escape. Megan sacrifices herself to the mirror, thus ending its reign of terror. Nikki invokes the mirror, begging it to restore things back to how they were before. She awakens in the room on the bed, dagger in hand, with Megan's corpse beneath her, in the same position as Mary Weatherford, having been subjected to an apparent time loop. The demon shows itself in the mirror before retreating, and Nikki fearfully covers it with a sheet.

Cast

Production 
The film (initially titled The Black Glass) was shot in Los Angeles, and Zelda Rubenstein was originally slated to make an appearance in the film. The cast and crew were approximately sixty-percent female. The film's production company, Orphan Eyes, was based in Detroit, Michigan.

Release
Mirror, Mirror screened theatrically at the Cannes Film Festival in May 1990, and was released theatrically in the United States on August 31 that year, opening first in Detroit. It also screened at the Chicago International Film Festival on October 19, 1990.

Critical reception
Overall reception for the film has been mixed to positive, with Entertainment Weekly giving Mirror, Mirror a "B−" rating. In his book Generation Multiplex, Timothy Shary called Mirror, Mirror "one of the best teen horror films in general" and citing it as an example of "the tyranny of teen popularity." Creature Features panned the film, giving it two stars and criticizing it as a "compendium of cliches."

Soundtrack

A soundtrack for Mirror, Mirror was released on CD through Orphan Records in 1990. Jimmy Lifton composed and performed the movie's orchestral tracts, with the movie also featuring songs by Scott Campbell, Jim Walker, and Gene Evaro.

Track list

Home media
The film was released on DVD on October 28, 2000 by Anchor Bay Entertainment. On March 6, 2004, it was re-released as part of a four-film set featuring the film's three sequels, called the "Mirror, Mirror Collection," also by Anchor Bay. The set was packaged in a reflective foil case. Both releases are out of print.

Sequels
Mirror, Mirror was followed by three sequels, Mirror, Mirror II: Raven Dance (1994), Mirror, Mirror III: The Voyeur (1995), and Mirror, Mirror IV: Reflection (2000). Reception for the sequels was largely negative, with the Orlando Sentinel criticizing Raven Dance as "reflect[ing] poorly on [the] classic original". William Sanderson was the only actor from the first film to return for the second movie, albeit in a different role. The second film notably featured an early film appearance for Mark Ruffalo.

References

Bibliography

External links
 
 

1990 films
1990 horror films
1990s high school films
1990 independent films
Films about witchcraft
1990s supernatural films
1990s teen horror films
American high school films
American independent films
American supernatural horror films
American teen horror films
Films set in California
Films shot in Los Angeles
1990s English-language films
1990s American films